Country State of Mind is the eighth studio album by American country music singer Josh Turner. It was released on August 21, 2020, via MCA Nashville.

Content
The album is composed entirely of cover songs. First released was Turner's cover of Randy Travis's "Forever and Ever, Amen", which features Travis on duet vocals. The recording was Travis's first since his 2013 stroke. Other artists whose songs are covered on the album include Patty Loveless, Vern Gosdin, Hank Williams, and Hank Williams Jr. Kris Kristofferson provides duet vocals on a cover of his own "Why Me", and John Anderson on his "I've Got It Made". Other collaborators on the album include Chris Janson (who sings on the title track), Allison Moorer, Runaway June, and Maddie & Tae.

Critical reception
Rating it 3.5 out of 5 stars, Stephen Thomas Erlewine of AllMusic stated that "Unlike some country covers albums, Country State of Mind doesn't rely heavily on shopworn classics." He also called the album "simple, straightforward, and satisfying", praising the inclusion of cover songs from the 1980s as well as the vocal contributions of Anderson and Kristofferson.

Track listing

Personnel
Adapted from AllMusic

John Anderson – duet vocals on "I Got It Made"
Perry Coleman – background vocals
Naomi Cooke – background vocals on "You Don't Seem to Miss Me"
Chad Cromwell – drums
David Dorn – keyboards
Dan Dugmore – lap steel guitar
Jamie Lin Wilson - harmonica on "Desperately"
Taylor Dye – background vocals on "Desperately"
Lashanda Evans – background vocals
Maddie Font – background vocals on "Desperately"
Kevin "Swine" Grantt – bass guitar, harmonica
Kenny Greenberg – acoustic guitar, baritone guitar, electric guitar, steel guitar, programming
Vicki Hampton – background vocals
Tania Hancheroff – background vocals
Terrell Hunt – background vocals
Evan Hutchings – drums, percussion
Chris Janson – duet vocals on "Country State of Mind"
Mike Johnson – dobro, steel guitar
Trey Keller – background vocals
Kris Kristofferson – duet vocals on "Why Me"
Jeff Linsenmaier – programming
Allison Moorer – duet vocals on "Alone and Forsaken"
Gordon Mote – Hammond B-3 organ, piano, synthesizer, Wurlitzer
Justin Niebank – programming
Danny Rader – banjo, dobro, acoustic guitar, hi-string guitar
Joe Spivey – fiddle, mandolin
Natalie Stovall – background vocals on "You Don't Seem to Miss Me"
Randy Travis – guest vocals on "Forever and Ever, Amen"
Josh Turner – acoustic guitar, lead vocals, background vocals
Jennifer Wayne – background vocals on "You Don't Seem to Miss Me"
Glenn Worf – bass guitar

Charts

References

2020 albums
MCA Records albums
Josh Turner albums
Covers albums
Albums produced by Kenny Greenberg